The 1981 Ohio State Buckeyes football team represented the Ohio State University in the 1981 Big Ten Conference football season. The Buckeyes compiled a 9–3 record, including the 1981 Liberty Bowl in Memphis, Tennessee, where they won, 31–28, against the Navy Midshipmen. Ohio State and Iowa were the only conference teams not to play one another, and they ended up in a tie for the Big Ten title. That cost the Buckeyes a possible outright conference championship and trip to the 1982 Rose Bowl as Iowa landed the Rose Bowl bid due to not going to the Rose Bowl longer than Ohio State.

Several Ohio State players ranked among the Big Ten leaders, including the following:
 Placekicker Bob Atha led the conference with 88 points scored and 44 extra points made and ranked second with 13 field goals made and a 68.4% field goal percentage.
 Garcia Lane led the conference with 205 punt return yards and ranked second with an average of 8.9 yards per punt return.
 Running back Tim Spencer led the conference with 12 rushing touchdowns and ranked second with 1,217 rushing yards and 1,427 yards from scrimmage.
 Quarterback Art Schlichter ranked third in the conference with 2,551 passing yards and 2,509 total yards and fifth with a 52.3 pass completion percentage. 
 Gary Williams ranked third in the conference with 50 receptions and fourth with 941 receiving yards.

Schedule

Roster

Depth chart

Coaching staff
 Earle Bruce – Head Coach (3rd year)
 Dennis Fryzel – Defensive Coordinator (3rd year)
 Glen Mason – Offensive Coordinator (4th year)
 Bill Myles – Offensive Line (5th year)
 Nick Saban – Defensive Backs (2nd year)
 Wayne Stanley – Running Backs (3rd year)
 Steve Szabo – Defensive Line (3rd year)
 Bob Tucker – Defensive Outside Linebackers (3rd year)
 Fred Zechman – Quarterbacks/Receivers (3rd year)

Game summaries

Duke

Michigan State

Stanford

Florida State

Wisconsin

Illinois

Indiana

at Purdue

Minnesota

Northwestern

Michigan

Liberty Bowl

1982 NFL draftees

References

Ohio State
Ohio State Buckeyes football seasons
Big Ten Conference football champion seasons
Liberty Bowl champion seasons
Ohio State Buckeyes football